The MEO Rip Curl Pro Portugal 2017 is an event of the World Surf League for the 2017 World Surf League Men's Championship Tour.

Peniche will receive for the ninth consecutive time the race of the world championship of surfing, which is the 10th of 11 stages of WSL in 2017. The event will be held from 20 to 31 October in the Supertubos beach at Peniche, (Leiria, Portugal) finishing earlier in 25 October with the victory of Gabriel Medina over Julian Wilson. This was Medina's first title in Portugal after a second place back in 2012.

Round 1

Round 2

Round 3

Round 4

Round 5

Quarter finals

Semi finals

Final

References

Rip Curl Pro Portugal
2017 World Surf League
2017 in Portuguese sport
October 2017 sports events in Europe